Albrecht Schubert (23 June 1886 – 26 November 1966) was a German general during World War II. He was a recipient of the Knight's Cross of the Iron Cross of Nazi Germany.

Life and career
Born 23 June 1886 in Glatz (modern Kłodzko, Poland, then in German Silesia), in a family of long Silesian ancestry. In 1904 he joined the Prussian Army and initially served with the Magdeburg-based 2nd 'Prinz Louis von Preussen' Infantry Regiment. By the time of the outbreak of World War I he rose to the rank of lieutenant.

Promoted to the rank of captain in 1914, during the war he served with the 1st Grenadier Regiment, 21st Reserve Brigade, 4th Landwehr Division, 11th Infantry Division and as a staff officer in the 202nd Infantry Division. After the war he remained within the Reichswehr and served in Stettin in the 2nd Division, and then in the 8th 'Prussian' Infantry Regiment. Promoted to major in 1926, to lieutenant colonel in 1931 and to full colonel in 1933. Three years later he became the commanding officer of the 12th Infantry Regiment. Following Adolf Hitler's rise to power, Schubert's career was fast-tracked. In April 1936 he was promoted to the rank of major general and already in March 1938 he became a lieutenant general. The following month he became the commanding officer of the 44th Infantry Division, with which he took part in the initial stages of World War II.

During the joint Nazi and Soviet invasion of Poland in 1939 his unit took part in the fights as part of the 14th Army. After the end of hostilities in October 1939 he was temporarily withdrawn to the personal reserve of the OKH, but was soon reinstated to active service as a provisional commanding officer of the XXIII Army Corps, with which he took part in the battle of France of 1940.

Shortly before the start of Operation Barbarossa, Schubert was promoted to the rank of General of the Infantry and his corps was relocated to East Prussia. In September 1941 he was awarded the Knight's Cross of the Iron Cross (Ritterkreuz). In May 1942 he temporarily commanded the entire 9th Army, but was again withdrawn from active service in the summer of that year. It was not until the following year that he was given the command over the Hannover-based XI Army Corps. Until the end of World War II he served on various staff positions in Vienna, away from the front. Schubert survived the war and died 26 November 1966 in Bielefeld, Germany.

Awards and decorations

 Knight's Cross of the Iron Cross on 17 September 1941 as General der Infanterie and commander of XXIII. Armeekorps

Notes

References

1886 births
1966 deaths
German Army generals of World War II
Generals of Infantry (Wehrmacht)
German Army personnel of World War I
People from Kłodzko
People from the Province of Silesia
Prussian Army personnel
Recipients of the clasp to the Iron Cross, 1st class
Recipients of the Gold German Cross
Recipients of the Knight's Cross of the Iron Cross
Reichswehr personnel